The governor of Smolensk Oblast is the highest official of Smolensk Oblast, a region in Central Russia. He heads the supreme executive body of the region — the Smolensk Oblast administration.

Alexey Ostrovsky was dismissed in March 2023 and succeeded by Vasily Anokhin.

List of office-holders 
This is a list of governors of Smolensk Oblast:

Elections 
The latest election for the office was held on 13 September 2015

References

 
Politics of Smolensk Oblast
Smolensk Oblast